Maṣbuta is the ritual of immersion in water in the Mandaean religion.

Overview
Mandaeans revere John the Baptist and practice frequent baptism (masbuta) as a ritual of purification, not of initiation. They are possibly one of the earliest peoples to practice ritual baptism. Mandaeans undergo baptism on Sundays (Habshaba), wearing a white sacral robe (rasta). Baptism for Mandaeans consists of a triple full immersion in water, a triple signing of the forehead with water and a triple drinking of water. The priest (rabbi) then removes a ring made of myrtle (klila) worn by the baptized and places it on their forehead. This is then followed by a handshake (kušṭa - hand of truth) with the priest. The final blessing involves the priest laying his right hand on the baptized person's head. Living water (fresh, natural, flowing water, called mia hayyi) is a requirement for baptism, therefore can only take place in rivers. All rivers are named Jordan (yardena) and are believed to be nourished by the World of Light. By the river bank, a Mandaean's forehead is anointed with sesame oil (misha) and partakes in a communion of sacramental bread (pihta) and water. Baptism for Mandaeans allows for salvation by connecting with the World of Light and for forgiveness of sins.

Although masbuta rituals are typically held only in the presence of Mandaeans, a historic commemorative masbuta ceremony was held at the 13th conference of the ARAM Society (titled "The Mandaeans"), which took place during 13-15 June 1999 on the banks of the Charles River at Harvard University.

Types
There are different types of masbuta used for different purposes. Similarly, there are also several different types of masiqta (see ). A few types of masbuta are:

360 baptisms: 360 consecutive baptisms are needed to cleanse a polluted priest. Sets of 360 baptisms are described in texts such as The Baptism of Hibil Ziwa and Šarḥ ḏ-Maṣbuta Rabia ("The Scroll of the Great Baptism"; DC 50).
Masbuta of Zihrun Raza Kasia, described in the Zihrun Raza Kasia scroll.

Masbuta is distinct from ṭamaša (or ṭmaša) and rišama, which are personal ablution rituals that do not require the presence of a priest. Tamaša is typically performed after bodily pollutions, such as seminal discharge, sexual activity, or after subsiding from unclean thoughts or anger at another person. This ablution is comparable to tevilah in Judaism and ghusl in Islam. Rišama is performed daily before prayers and religious ceremonies or after bowel evacuation and is comparable to wudu in Islam.

Parallels
Birger A. Pearson finds many parallels between the Sethian ritual of the Five Seals and the Mandaean baptismal ritual of masbuta.

Gallery
Gallery of Mandaeans performing masbuta in the Karun River in Ahvaz, Iran:

See also
History of baptism
Baptism in early Christianity
Immersion baptism
Ritual washing in Judaism
Mikveh in Judaism
Five Seals in Sethianism

The Baptism of Hibil Ziwa
Bihram
Yardna

Further reading

Nasoraia, Brikha (2022). Masbuta: The Mandaean Baptism (forthcoming). Belgium: Brepols Publishers.

References

External links
Videos and images from the Worlds of Mandaean Priests (University of Exeter)
Mandaean masbuta performed at 13 June 1999 ARAM conference

Baptism
Mandaic words and phrases
Mandaean rituals
Ritual purification
Water and religion